Aminabad (also Romanized as Amīnābād) is a village in Mir Shams ol Din Rural District, in the Central District of Tonekabon County, Mazandaran Province, Iran. At the 2006 census, its population was 363, in 103 families.

References 

Populated places in Tonekabon County